

The Galați shipyard, formally Damen Shipyards Galați, is a shipyard located on the Danube in Galați, a city located in the Moldavia region of Romania. It was founded in 1893 as the G. Fernic et Co Mechanical construcions and iron and bronze foundry (Uzinele de construcții mecanice și turnătorie de fier și bronz G. Fernic et Co). In 1897, it was renamed as the G. Fernic et Co Shypyard (Șantierul naval G. Fernic et Co).

History

Origins to 1893
The earliest mention of a shipyard in Galați comes from a firman issued to Alexandru Lăpușneanu in the late 16th century, regarding the arming of some caïques constructed there. In the following period, many shipyards were established around the port of Galați. During the first half of the 18th century, one shipyard developed extensively. It incorporated a launch slipway, a rigging shop, material stores, a sawmill, and a log warehouse. In 1761, the Ragusan traveler Roger Joseph Boscovich, described the shipyard as an "arsenal" where ships were being built for the Turks. Due to Moldavia being a vassal state, most war vessel production was on behalf of the Ottoman Navy through the 1820s. By 1773, many ships including frigates, caravels, various commercial ships, as well as ships of the line with up to 60 cannons were constructed there. Austrian Captain Georg Lauterer reported in 1783 that annually the shipyard was building 10 to 12 ships with 2 to 3 masts and was repairing many more. Many of these ships were built for the Ottoman Empire, but the construction cost was covered by the Danubian Principalities. One such order came in 1794, when 10 warships were to built at Galați and payed for by Wallachia and Moldavia. 

The wood, of high quality, came from forests upstream and was brought by raft. In 1817, a brig was built for Voivode Scarlat Callimachi. However, it was not until the late 1830s, following the establishment of a free port at Galați, that the bulk of its ships started being used domestically: seven vessels were built there in 1839, followed by ten in 1840. Due to the fewer and fewer orders for wooden ships, the shipyard ceased its activity by late 1860. Following the unification of Moldavia and Wallachia, the Headquarters and the Fleet Workshop of the Romanian Navy were moved to Galați. In 1879, the workshop became the Fleet Arsenal.

1893 through communism
In March 1893, a local resident named Gheorghe Fernic established the "G. Fernic et Co Mechanical constructions and iron and bronze foundry" together with I. Guiller and T. Poujollat. In 1897, Fernic obtained approval to create a branch of his company that would work on ship repairs, which was named the "G. Fernic et Co Shypyard" (Șantierul naval G. Fernic et Co). In 1898, two state-owned floating dry docks started to be rented to the shipyard for repair works. In 1907, the shipyard was extended. Also in 1907, four river monitors (NMS Ion C. Brătianu, Mihail Kogălniceanu, Alexandru Lahovari and Lascăr Catargiu) were commissioned for the Romanian Navy. Built in sections in the Austro-Hungarian port of Trieste, they were assembled in Galați. In 1911, under the Premiership of Petre P. Carp, the area suffered some structural collapse, allegedly as a result of bad workmanship and political corruption (investigated by Nicolae Fleva on behalf of the Opposition). Through further association with Stabilimento Tecnico Triestino, several buildings were constructed at that time. In 1916, the shipyard changed its name to the "Danube Shipyards".

During the interwar period and into World War II, the yard had strategic significance, and two submarines (NMS Rechinul and NMS Marsuinul) and one minelaying destroyer escort (NMS Amiral Murgescu) were built there. Initially commanded by German captains, then replaced with Romanian crews, the submarines later fell to the Soviet Navy. From 1938 to 1944, Galați completed 65 civilian ships and 11 warships: in addition to the submarines and minelaying destroyer, these consisted of four motor torpedo boats (the Vedenia-class) and four minesweepers (the Democrația-class). The country's first native-built dry dock was constructed there between 1937 and 1942. Before the war, the largest ships built were a river steamer of 420 tons and barges up to 1,700 tons at Galati; the yard employed 500 to 800 men. The number of employees reached nearly 2,000 during the war. Romania's first native-built oil tanker, SRT-128, was launched there in 1942. Between 1893 and 1944, 116 ships were fully-built at the shipyard. Many others were assembled and repaired.

The components of the Cernavodă Bridge were also built at Galați. In 1974, the Communist regime made a massive investment into the shipbuilding industry, so that the yard became fully stocked with supplies, including an animal farm. From that time until the 1989 fall of the regime, some 80% of the shipyard's products were exported.

Damen Group era
Following this event, there were 32 unsold boats at the shipyard, and these were only liquidated in full in 2000. Meanwhile, the Dutch Damen Group had taken over the yard. The group's interest in Galați began in 1994, when it subcontracted several cargo vessel hulls. This was the means by which its manager decided whether to invest somewhere. Noticing too that the boats left over from the Communist period were being reinforced, he decided to take control of the shipyard company's stock, which happened in 1999. Although he wished to obtain 100% of the shares, he only managed to acquire 99%, the remainder being in the hands of unidentified individuals who received privatization vouchers in the 1990s.

Galați is the largest naval shipyard on the Danube, its output ranging from large tankers to small coast guard patrol boats. The company also represents a significant element of the local economy. Since 1990, all of its products have gone to export. Following Damen's takeover, an investment plan focusing on improving efficiency and working conditions was introduced. For example, at the time of the takeover, spoons and coffee cups were listed in the inventory; afterwards, all items worth under $100 were considered disposable goods and no longer placed on the record books. The yard builds offshore vessels, naval vessels, special vessels (such as buoy laying vessels, patrol vessels and research vessels), tugs, workboats and mega yachts, and has also produced oil tankers, container carriers, cargo barges and drilling rig platforms—over 250 vessels since 1999. There were some 1550 employees at the end of 2010, as well as 1150 subcontracted employees handling support functions including electricity, HVAC, carpentry, blasting and painting. This was down from 10,000 total employees in 2006, of whom 3100 worked for Damen. Engineering services are mainly supplied by a Galați firm established in 2004 in which Damen is the major shareholder. Production takes place on four lines: for vessels up to 10,000 dwt, for vessels up to 26,000 dwt, for vessels up to 50,000 dwt and for tugs and workboats. There is also a workshop for piping and galvanizing and a blasting and painting hall.

Warships built

See also 
 Port of Galați
 Damen Group
 Constanța Shipyard
 Daewoo Mangalia Heavy Industries
 List of Romanian-built warships of World War II

Gallery

Notes

References

External links

 Damen Galaţi official site

Shipyard
Companies of Galați County
Manufacturing companies established in 1893
Shipyards of Romania
1893 establishments in Romania